Sir Henry Hamilton, 1st Baronet (1710 – 26 June 1782) was an Anglo-Irish politician. 

Hamilton sat in the Irish House of Commons as the Member of Parliament for Londonderry City from 1747 to 1768, before representing Killybegs between 1768 and his death in 1782. On 23 January 1775 he was made a baronet, of Manor Cunningham in the Baronetage of Ireland; the title became extinct upon his death.

References

1710 births
1782 deaths
18th-century Anglo-Irish people
Baronets in the Baronetage of Ireland
Irish MPs 1727–1760
Irish MPs 1761–1768
Irish MPs 1769–1776
Irish MPs 1776–1783
Members of the Parliament of Ireland (pre-1801) for County Donegal constituencies
Members of the Parliament of Ireland (pre-1801) for County Londonderry constituencies